James Patrick "Shane" McGrath (6 June 1919 – 1 November 1974) was an Australian rules footballer who played for Melbourne in the Victorian Football League during the 1940s.

A fullback, McGrath was a member of Melbourne's 1941 premiership side before missing the following two seasons due to war service. He was a premiership player again in 1948 and captained the club during his last season, in 1950. McGrath represented Victoria at interstate football regularly.

Footnotes

External links

1919 births
Australian rules footballers from Victoria (Australia)
Melbourne Football Club players
1974 deaths
Melbourne Football Club captains
Melbourne Football Club Premiership players
Two-time VFL/AFL Premiership players